The 2013 ITF Women's Circuit is the 2013 edition of the second-tier tour for women's professional tennis. It is organised by the International Tennis Federation and is a tier below the WTA Tour. The ITF Women's Circuit includes tournaments with prize money ranging from $10,000 up to $100,000.

Schedule

January–March

April–June

July–September

October–December

Retired players

Statistical information
To avoid confusion and double counting, these tables should only be updated after the end of the week.

Key

Titles won by player
As of September 16.

Titles won by nation

As of September 23.

Ranking distribution
"+H" indicates that Hospitality is provided.

External links
 International Tennis Federation (ITF)

 
2013 in tennis
2013